Xiangkhouang (Lao: ຊຽງຂວາງ, meaning 'Horizontal City') is a province of Laos on the Xiangkhoang Plateau, in the nation's northeast. The province has the distinction of being the most heavily bombed place on Earth.

The province was originally known as the Principality of Muang Phuan (Muang Phouan / Xieng Khouang). Its present capital is Phonsavan. The population of the province as of the 2015 census was 244,684.

Apart from floodplains, the largest area of level land in the country is on the province's Xiangkhoang Plateau. The plateau is characterized by rolling hills and grassland whose elevation averages . The country's highest peak, Phou Bia, rises at the south side of the plateau. Nam Et-Phou Louey is a National Biodiversity Conservation Area (NBCA) in the province, covering an area of 5,959 km2, and overlaps into Houaphanh and Luang Prabang provinces.

The province's Plain of Jars was designated as a UNESCO World Heritage Site in 2019.

History 

While the origin of the Plain of Jars' people is unknown, the recorded history of Xiangkhouang is interlinked with the Tai Phuan. As an ancient civilization, its prehistory is linked to the enigmatic megalithic stone jars of the Plain of Jars (with prehistoric material dating back to 2000 BCE, with an Iron Age period of 500 BCE and 500–800 CE period dominating the archaeological finds) representing burial grounds. The Tai Phuan or Phuan people are a Buddhist Tai-Lao ethnic group that migrated to Laos from southern China and by the 13th century had formed the independent principality Muang Phuan on the Plain of Jars with Xieng Khouang (the contemporary Muang Khoun) as its capital. They prospered from the overland trade in metals and forest products with India and China. In the mid-14th century, Muang Phuan was incorporated into the Lan Xang Kingdom under King Fa Ngum.

The Xieng Khouang Plateau was the center of trade for a large area of upland Southeast Asia, extending to Vietnam, Samrong Sen in Cambodia, the Khorat Plateau in northeast Thailand, Da Nang, and the North Cachar Hills of northeastern India.

According to the Pongsawadan Meuang Puan or the Muang Puan Chronicles, the Phuan people, a Buddhist Tai-Lao ethnic group, were the first people who migrated in the 13th century from China to settle this province, creating the Muang Phuan Kingdom. They established trade in metals and forest products and were prosperous. During the mid-14th century they were subsumed into the Lan Xang Kingdom. Siamese invasions in 1777–1779, 1834–1836, and 1875–1876) sought to resettle the Phuan population to regions under Siamese control.

In subsequent years the Haw invaders from China looted the province and Luang Prabang. In the 1890s the province came under French colonial rule following the Franco-Siamese War. During the Second Indochina War of the 1960s and 1970s the province suffered through the Laotian Civil War between royalists and the Pathet Lao until 1975, when the Pathet Lao took power. Xiangkhouang was the Lao province most bombed by the US Air Force (USAF) in support of the royalist forces. As a result of this prolonged warfare, Muong Khoun, the original capital of the province, was virtually destroyed, resulting in a move of the capital to Phonsavan. During the wars, most of the 16th–19th century temples were destroyed except for the Wat Phia Wat Temple. The royalists were led by General Vang Pao, who was born in the province.

Geography

The province borders Luang Prabang province to the northwest, Houaphanh province to the northeast, Vietnam to the east, Bolikhamsai province to the southeast, and Vientiane province to the southwest. The capital is Phonsavan. Xiangkhouang and Vientiane provinces are part of the Nam Ngum River watershed.

Apart from floodplains, the largest expanse of level land in the country is on the province's Xiangkhoang Plateau. This area is characterized by rolling hills and grassland whose elevation averages . The country's highest peak, Phou Bia, rises at the southern side of the plateau, while the Plain of Jars is at the plateau's center.

The province is 400 km northeast of Vientiane. Phou Bia, at 2700 m elevation, is the highest peak in the province, and the highest in Laos. The capital city is at an elevation of about 1,000 m above mean sea level (AMSL) with Kham District in a low-laying basin at an elevation of about 600 m AMSL.

Protected areas
Nam Et-Phou Louey is a National Biodiversity Conservation Area (NBCA) which covers an area of 5,959 km2 in Xiangkhouang, Houaphanh, and Luang Prabang provinces. The park consists mainly of mountains and hills, with elevations ranging between 336 and 2257 metres. The area is the source of many rivers. It is named after the Nam Et River and Phou Louey Mountain ('Forever Mountain').

The area has a high level of biodiversity, and a number of endangered species including tiger, leopard, clouded leopard, Asian golden cat, marbled cat, civet, gaur, Sambar deer, white-cheeked gibbon, sun bear, black bear, Asian elephant, dhole, hornbill and three species of otter.

Administrative divisions
Thathom District was moved to Xaisomboun province in January 2006.

Economy

Xiangkhouang province is the main maize-producing area of Laos. The centre for trade and tourism is Phonsavan. In the village of Ban Napia near Phonsavan, villagers re-use unexploded ordnance (UXO) scrap metal to make spoons to be sold as souvenirs. The scrap metal is checked for safety beforehand by UXO Lao. This community-based project provides income for the villagers. As of 2012, three minor accidents involving UXO had been reported.

Ethnic groups 
Xiangkhouang is home to five different ethnic groups. The Tai Dam, Tai Daeng, Phuan, Khmu, and Hmong have settled in the province. Their traditional houses, dresses, beliefs and rituals are part of the cultural heritage of Laos. There are also minorities of Laotian Chinese and Vietnamese as well as some international workers from Korea, Japan, Europe, and North America.

Tai Dam 

Tai Dam, Tai Daeng, and Tai Phuan belong to the Tai language family, by far the most significant language in Laos, spoken by 60% of the national population. The Tai Dam migrated from northern Vietnam to Laos 80–300 years ago. They are not Buddhists. Instead, they practice a form of ancestor and spirit worship. Tai Dam are well known producers of fine quality silk and cotton textiles and many women export directly to markets in Japan and the US. Older Tai Dam women still wear the traditional blue indigo cotton shirt, skirt, and black turban woven with colored patterns. They produce rice alcohol, called lao lao that is consumed socially and used for ritual purposes.

Tai Dam settled in upland valleys near streams and irrigable and accessible plains scattered among Lao and Phuan villages. They built rectangular symmetric houses on pilings, with a rice granary under the house. Villages are composed of 15¬60 houses and are not fenced. The people subsist on wet rice, vegetables, poultry,  weaving, sewing, and hunting.

The ancestors of the Tai Phuan once founded the kingdom of the same name.

Khmu 

Part of the Mon-Khmer branch of the Austro-Asiatic linguistic family, the Khmu are one of the largest ethnic groups in Laos. They settled in the area several thousand years ago. The Khmu rapidly acculturated and there is now little in their clothing that distinguishes them from the surrounding Lao, although they speak a completely different language.

Khmu houses are built on stilts. Each village has a communal house where men gather for political discussions, or work together on basket making and other crafts. Like many ethnic groups in Lao the Khmu practice their own form of animism. The Khmu are well known for their skill at making baskets, fish traps, and other objects from bamboo. Their material culture, their tools, utensils, baskets and netbags reflect their continued reliance on the forest. Growing rice, hunting, gathering forest products and producing handicrafts provide some cash income. They distill lao hai ('jar alcohol').

Hmong 

Hmong people migrated from China to Laos between 1800 and 1900. Having a strong desire for independence, they rebelled against Chinese attempts to control and settle them and fled in successive waves southwards. During the Lao Civil war in the 1960s and 1970s, Hmong were recruited by the CIA's "secret army", commanded by Hmong General Vang Pao. Hmong villages were relocated in free-fire zones and many died during these evacuations or due to fighting. When the communists came to power in 1975 tens of thousands of Hmong fled to Thailand or emigrated to the US. Today remittances from the diaspora are a major economic factor in the province, fueling significant construction activity.

The Hmong present 6-10% of the total population of Laos and remain most numerous and concentrated in eastern Xiangkhouang. In the province the White Hmong, the Striped Hmong, and the Green Hmong can be distinguished. The easiest way to differentiate these groups is by looking at the women's dresses.

Hmong live in forested mountains between 800 and 1,500 meters elevation and in Laos they are categorized as Lao Soung, highland people, although today there are more and more villages located in the lowlands. They live in villages ranging in size from 15 to over 60 houses. These are not fenced and are organized by clan. The rectangular houses are on beaten soil and have one room without windows. The walls are made of vertical wood planks and bamboo and a thatched roof. Hmong are known for their knowledge of the forest, herbal medicines, and expertise in raising animals. Their agricultural system is based on rain-fed slope cultivation with slash-and-burn techniques. They live on rice, corn and vegetable production, swine and poultry husbandry, gathering, hunting, embroidery, and basket work.

Their religion is a form of shamanistic animism with a cult of ancestors and spirits, and a belief in three souls. Certain spirits protect the people within the village boundaries while others maintain their influence over the plant and animal kingdom outside the village.

Hmong women are renowned for their embroidery and weaving. Traditionally, clothes are made from hemp and cotton. Batik, used only by Green Hmong for their distinctive skirts, is a very long process. Before dying the cloth the pattern is marked with wax. The wax is then removed to reveal the pattern. The wax is applied with a batik pen and the design is completed square by square. Many geometrical patterns exist and they are passed on from mother to daughter. The material is pleated by running a sharp edged stone along the pleat lines on alternate sides of the cloth, and sewing the poles into place at the waistband. These skirts and many other items of Hmong clothing are also embroidered. Embroidery and applique is a social activity, a time for women to sit together and exchange views and news.

Hmong New Year celebrations in December, starting from the 15th day of the ascending moon, are accompanied by numerous activities including top-spinning competitions, dances, songs, and bull fights. It is one of the main occasions for finding a wife or a husband. The young men and women toss the makkono, a small fabric ball, as part of a courting ritual. The throwing of the ball can go on for hours. During the festivities Hmong women wear their traditional dresses, adorned with intricate embroidery and silver jewelry.

Landmarks
The tourism department of Laos has listed 63 notable landmarks in the province. Thirty-two are natural sites, 18 are cultural sites, and are 13 historical sites. Of these some of the important sites are the following.

The province's most distinctive landmark is the Plain of Jars. The "jars" are 2,100 tubular-shaped megalithic stone jars used for funerary purposes. They are found throughout the province in clusters containing from one to several hundred jars each. The jars date from the Iron Age (500 BCE–500 CE). Nearest to Phonsavan is Jar Site 1, with an area of 25 hectares (ha). The largest jar found here is 2.5 m x 2.5 m, while the rest are half this size. One jar has decorations on it. The megalithic jar sites of Xiangkhouang were inscribed on UNESCO's list of World Heritage Sites in July 2019.

Muang Khoun was the capital of the ancient Phuan Kingdom of the 14th century. It is southeast of Phonsavan. At the Wat Piawat Temple, destroyed during the conflicts of the First Indochina War (1946–1954) and the Second Vietnam War (1955–1975), the ruins of a stone wall with brick archways, relics of the former colonial rule of France over this part of Laos and from the whole country, a large-sized statue of Buddha, broken pillars and short sections of walls remain to this day and are still clearly visible as well as accessible. Once buried in the thick tropical forest, the That Foun stupa, dating back some 450 years, can be seen near the road outside Phonsavan. In an ethnic village of the Phuan, to the south of Phonsavan, Ban Napi mounds of war scrap can be seen buried in tableware. During the 1980s, eight families came together and assembled bits and pieces of aluminum from damaged, crashed or shot-down US Air Force (USAF) and other aircraft of air forces of US-aligned countries (such as the Royal Lao Air Force) in mounds of melted metal, lack, wood and ash. Such war debris and wreckage can be found scattered between the Lang Waterfall and Jar Site 3 of the Plain of Jars.

A secret tunnel was constructed below the hills of the Phu Kheng Jar Quarry Site during the Second Vietnam War. Reinforced-concrete bunkers with night-camps are visible nearby. Unexploded ordnance (UXOs) can be found in large quantities in this Laotian province and these are all in the process of getting cleared and removed away under the aegis of the UK-based Mines Advisory Group (MAG). The Visitor Information Centre established by the (MAG) in Phonsavan provides information on the history of the aerial bombardment campaigns in this part of Laos.

See also
Ban Phou Pheung Noi

References

Further reading

External links

 Tragic Legacy: Profound Mystery – The Unknown Story of Xieng Khouang by Mike Matsuno

 
Provinces of Laos